The Boston Atlas (1832–1857) newspaper of Boston, Massachusetts, was published in daily and semi-weekly editions in the mid-19th century. John H. Eastburn established the paper in 1832. Editors included Richard Hildreth, Richard Haughton, William Hayden, Thomas M. Brewer, William Schouler, R. Carter. Among the contributors: Joseph Carter Abbott, Benjamin Perley Poore, Samuel F. Tappan. Its office stood at no.18 State Street and later in the Old State House. The paper supported the Whig Party. Its Democratic rival, with which it sparred constantly, was The Boston Post. In 1857 the Boston Traveller absorbed The Atlas.

Variant titles

References

Images

1832 establishments in Massachusetts
Publications established in 1832
Newspapers published in Boston
1857 disestablishments in Massachusetts
19th century in Boston
Defunct newspapers published in Massachusetts
Whig newspapers (United States)
Publications disestablished in 1857